Sanhe is a town under the administration of Jianyang City in eastern Sichuan province, China, located  northeast of downtown Jianyang as the crow flies. , it has 13 villages under its administration.

References

Township-level divisions of Sichuan
Jianyang, Sichuan